Yvonne Edwards Tucker, also known as Yvonne Edwards–Tucker (born 1941) is an American artist, known as a potter, sculptor, and educator. She has taught at Florida A&M University in Tallahassee since 1973.

About 
Yvonne Edwards is African-American and was raised in the South Side area of Chicago, Illinois. She studied in her early youth at the South Side Community Art Center, and Art Institute of Chicago. She continued her art studies into college and graduated in 1962 from University of Illinois at Urban–Champaign. While attending University of Illinois at Urban–Champaign she took her first ceramics course and met her future husband, Curtis Tucker (1939–1992).

Tucker began her graduate studies at University of California, Los Angeles (UCLA) between 1962 and 1964, and later transferred to nearby Otis Art Institute to study ceramics where she graduated with a MFA degree in 1968. She studied with Helen Watson, Charles White, Joseph Mugnaini, Herman "Kofi" Bailey, and Michael Frimkess.

Together husband and wife team, Yvonne and Curtis collaborated on sculptures for over 20 years, until his death in 1992. They moved to Tallahassee, Florida in 1968. Together they developed a new technique called "Afro-Raku", combining contemporary, Native American, Eastern Asian, and African traditional ceramics methods.

See also 

 List of African-American visual artists

References

External links 
 Tucker, Yvonne and Curtis papers, 1960-2002, Amistad Research Center, Tulane University

1941 births
Artists from Chicago
University of Illinois Urbana-Champaign alumni
Otis College of Art and Design alumni
University of California, Los Angeles alumni
Florida A&M University faculty
Women potters
African-American women artists
Living people
American women academics
21st-century African-American people
20th-century African-American people
20th-century African-American women
21st-century African-American women